Elections to Inverclyde Council were held on 1 May 2003, the same day as other Scottish Local Government elections and the Scottish Parliament Election.

This was the last election using 20 single member wards, in which the Scottish Liberal Democrats won a majority of seats, winning 13.

Election Results

Ward results

References

2003
2003 Scottish local elections